Markham is a census-designated place (CDP) in Grays Harbor County, Washington, United States. The population was 111 at the 2010 census.

Geography
Markham is located at  (46.913041, -123.985296).

According to the United States Census Bureau, the CDP has a total area of 1.1 square miles (2.9 km2), all of it land.

Demographics

As of the census of 2000, there were 95 people, 41 households, and 30 families residing in the CDP. The population density was 84.6 people per square mile (32.7/km2). There were 51 housing units at an average density of 45.4/sq mi (17.6/km2). The racial makeup of the CDP was 94.74% White, 1.05% Native American, 2.11% Asian, 1.05% from other races, and 1.05% from two or more races. Hispanic or Latino of any race were 2.11% of the population.

There were 41 households, out of which 17.1% had children under the age of 18 living with them, 65.9% were married couples living together, 4.9% had a female householder with no husband present, and 26.8% were non-families. 19.5% of all households were made up of individuals, and 2.4% had someone living alone who was 65 years of age or older. The average household size was 2.32 and the average family size was 2.67.

In the CDP, the population was spread out, with 12.6% under the age of 18, 6.3% from 18 to 24, 22.1% from 25 to 44, 47.4% from 45 to 64, and 11.6% who were 65 years of age or older. The median age was 48 years. For every 100 females, there were 115.9 males. For every 100 females age 18 and over, there were 107.5 males.

The median income for a household in the CDP was $63,750, and the median income for a family was $96,816. Males had a median income of $40,625 versus $23,750 for females. The per capita income for the CDP was $23,700. There were no families and 12.3% of the population living below the poverty line, including no under eighteens and 100.0% of those over 64.

References

Census-designated places in Grays Harbor County, Washington
Census-designated places in Washington (state)
Populated coastal places in Washington (state)